Batocera timorlautensis is a species of beetle in the family Cerambycidae. It was described by Heller in 1897. It is known from the Moluccas.

References

Batocerini
Beetles described in 1897